Marcos do Nascimento Teixeira (born 5 June 1996), commonly known as Marcão, is a Brazilian professional footballer who plays as a central defender for La Liga club Sevilla.

Club career

Avaí
Marcão was born in Londrina, Paraná, Marcão started his career with Avaí. He made his senior debut on 12 April 2014 at the age of 17, starting in a 4–1 Campeonato Catarinense away loss against Chapecoense.

Atlético Paranaense
Marcão subsequently moved to Atlético Paranaense, and made his debut for the club on 5 February 2015 by starting in a 3–1 loss at Rio Branco for the Campeonato Paranaense championship.

Guaratinguetá (loan)
On 31 July 2015, he was loaned to Série C club Guaratinguetá, after a partnership between both clubs was established.

Ferroviária (loan)
On 15 December 2015, Marcão was loaned to Ferroviária, along with other Atlético teammates. After being a regular starter he returned to Furacão, now being definitely assigned to the first team.

Marcão made his Série A debut on 26 June 2016, coming on as a late substitute for Nikão in a 2–0 home win against Grêmio.

Galatasaray

2018–19 season

On 14 January 2019, Marcão moved to Turkish side Galatasaray on a three and a half year contract for an initial fee of €4 million. He played his first official match with Galatasaray in the 18th week of the 2018–19 season, in the Ankaragücü match, which was played at Türk Telekom Stadium and Galatasaray won 6–0. Marcão, who started the match in the starting 11, remained on the field for 90 minutes.

After being included in the team, he played for 90 minutes in all ten league matches. He could not play in the Fenerbahçe derby, the 28th week of the league, due to a card penalty.

With the Benfica match he played on 14 February 2019, he made his first UEFA Europa League match of his career. He finished the year with 21 matches, 15 of which were in the Super League. When the season was completed, he won his first Super League and Turkish Cup championship with Galatasaray.

2019–20 season
He started the 2019–20 football year with the Denizlispor match in the first week. In the 34th and 43rd times of the match, he was repeatedly banned from the game by receiving a yellow card. He could not find the opportunity to play in the second week due to his penalty. While he played for 90 minutes in the next seven matches, he missed the 10th week Çaykur Rizespor match again due to his penalty. He played in the UEFA Champions League for the first time with the Club Brugge match on 18 September 2019.

He stayed on the field for 90 minutes in all six matches played by Galatasaray football team in the Champions League. He finished the season with a total of 39 matches, 28 of which were league games. In addition, he won the TFF Super Cup for the first time in his career with the Akhisar Belediyespor match played on 7 August 2019 and Galatasaray won 3–1. A centre-back, Marcão wore only Galatasaray jersey in the super league.

2020–21 season
While Galatasaray lost the league championship with goal difference, Marcão became the most stable player of the Yellow-Red team in the Super League throughout the season. The Brazilian football player stayed on the field for 3325 minutes in 37 matches, all of them in the first 11.

2021–22 season
On 22 May 2021, Galatasaray extended Marcão's contract for two more years. The club announced the official announcement.
During the game against Giresunspor on 16 August 2021, he was sent off for headbutting and punching his teammate Kerem Aktürkoğlu.

Sevilla 
On 8 July 2022, Sevilla announced the signing of Marcão on a five-year contract subject to a medical. fee is around €12+3( bonus) millions.

Personal life
His older brother Dionatan was also a professional footballer before he died of a heart attack at the age of 25. Marcão is married and has two children.

Career statistics

Club

Honours
Galatasaray
 Süper Lig: 2018–19
 Turkish Cup: 2018–19
 Turkish Super Cup: 2019

Individual
Super Lig Defender of the Year: 2019–20

References

External links
 Profile at the Sevilla FC website
 
 
 
 
 

1996 births
Living people
Sportspeople from Londrina
Brazilian footballers
Association football defenders
Campeonato Brasileiro Série A players
Campeonato Brasileiro Série C players
Primeira Liga players
Süper Lig players
La Liga players
Avaí FC players
Club Athletico Paranaense players
Guaratinguetá Futebol players
Associação Ferroviária de Esportes players
Atlético Clube Goianiense players
Rio Ave F.C. players
G.D. Chaves players
Galatasaray S.K. footballers
Sevilla FC players
Brazilian expatriate footballers
Brazilian expatriate sportspeople in Portugal
Brazilian expatriate sportspeople in Spain
Expatriate footballers in Portugal
Expatriate footballers in Spain
Brazilian expatriate sportspeople in Turkey
Expatriate footballers in Turkey